At least two ships of the Peruvian Navy have been named BAP Pisco:

  was a  launched in 1953 as USS LST-1163 and renamed USS Waldo County in 1955. She was transferred to Peru in 1984 serving until being scrapped in 2012
  is a  launched in 2017

Peruvian Navy ship names